is a Japanese classification of several intercolumnar struts of different origin installed in the intervals between bracket complexes (tokyō) at wooden architectures in East Asia.

In origin they were necessary to help support the roof; however, at the end of the 10th century the invention of the hidden roof made them superfluous. They remained in use, albeit in a purely decorative role, and are typical of the Wayō style.  The Zenshūyō style used by Zen temples has instead bracket complexes even between posts.

Shuzhu or Kentozuka

The simplest of these struts are the  composed of a short post and a bearing block.

Minozuka
Similar to the kentozuka is the fan-shaped strut called  (see gallery), which can have decorations on the two sides called  or a collar-like decoration between post and bearing block. The name comes from its shape, similar to that of a traditional straw raincoat called mino.

Hana-hijiki

Renzigong or Warizuka

The 人-shaped dougong (Chinese: 人字栱)  strut consists of a wooden inverted V topped by a bearing block.

Kaerumata or Tuofeng

The  or tuofeng (駝峰) was named after its shape, resembling a frog's splayed legs.

Its origins are not known with certainty, but it may be an evolution of the warizuka. Invented during the 12th century, it became gradually more and more elaborate, to the point where in the Edo period the strut itself would be hidden behind the decorations.

Two basic types exist.

Types of nakazonae

Notes

References

Japanese architectural features
Timber framing